White Oak Township is located in McLean County, Illinois. As of the 2010 census, its population was 899 and it contained 355 housing units.

Geography

Demographics

References

External links
City-data.com
Illinois State Archives
Denman School Collection - McLean County Museum of History archives

Townships in McLean County, Illinois
Townships in Illinois